Amago (尼子) is a Japanese word meaning "child of a nun", and has various other uses:

People
 Amago clan, a Japanese daimyō clan
 Amago Haruhisa (1514–1561), Japanese daimyō
 Amago Katsuhisa (1553–1578), Japanese daimyō
 Amago Kunihisa (1492–1554), Japanese daimyō
 Amago Okihisa (1497–1534), Japanese daimyō
 Amago Tsunehisa (1458–1541), Japanese daimyō
 Amago Yoshihisa (1540–1610), Japanese daimyō

Other uses
 Amago Station, a railroad station in Kōra, Shiga, Japan
 Oncorhynchus masou macrostomus or amago, a salmonid fish endemic to western Japan